Richard McKenzie may refer to:

 Richard McKenzie (actor) (born 1930), American character actor
 Richard McKenzie (Tasmanian politician) (1850–1919), Australian politician
 Richard McKenzie (South Australian politician) (1883–1959), Australian politician
 Rich McKenzie (born 1971), former American football linebacker
 Jock McKenzie (rugby union, born 1892) (1892–1968), New Zealand rugby player